A split album (or split) is a music album that includes tracks by two or more separate artists. There are also singles and EPs of the same variety, which are often called "split singles" and "split EPs" respectively. Split albums differ from "various artists" compilation albums in that they generally include several tracks of each artist, or few artists with one or two tracks each, instead of multiple artists with only one or two tracks each.

History
Split albums were initially done on vinyl records, with music from one artist on one side of the record and music from a second artist on the opposite side. As vinyl albums declined as a mass medium, CD issues have followed the practice. Although a CD is not turned over the same way as a vinyl, the term "sides" is still applied figuratively.
Since the early 1980s, the format has been used widely by independent record labels, and artists in punk rock, hardcore, grindcore, black metal, noise and indie rock circles. Splits usually receive an underground fanbase even if the artists featured are mainstream, as the success of split albums is most often not of a mainstream proportion.

Album types

References